Kamianka  (until 1952 , Rysya Yama, lit. Lynx Pit) is a village (selo) in Stryi Raion, Lviv Oblast, of Western Ukraine. It belongs to Skole urban hromada, one of the hromadas of Ukraine. Local government is administered by Kamiantska village council.

The village is in southern part in Lviv Oblast in the Ukrainian Carpathians, within the limits of the Eastern Beskids (Skole Beskids). Downstream along the Kamianka are the Kamyanetskiy Falls, a hydrological natural monument of Ukraine.

The first mention of Kamianka dates from 1774.

Until 18 July 2020, Kamianka belonged to Skole Raion. The raion was abolished in July 2020 as part of the administrative reform of Ukraine, which reduced the number of raions of Lviv Oblast to seven. The area of Skole Raion was merged into Stryi Raion.

Notes

External links 
 Сколівщина.-Львів.1996 
 Гірське село Кам'янка 

Villages in Stryi Raion